Werner Unger (4 May 1931, in Strehla – 15 March 2002) was a German football player who competed in the 1964 Summer Olympics.

He played in the DDR-Oberliga for BSG Motor Zwickau and FC Vorwärts Berlin.

In the East Germany national football team he appeared seven times between 1954 and 1964.

References

External links 
 

1931 births
2002 deaths
German footballers
Olympic footballers of the United Team of Germany
Olympic bronze medalists for the United Team of Germany
Olympic medalists in football
Footballers at the 1964 Summer Olympics
Medalists at the 1964 Summer Olympics
DDR-Oberliga players
German footballers needing infoboxes
Association football midfielders
People from Meissen (district)
East Germany international footballers
Sportspeople from Saxony